This is a list of the first minority male lawyer(s) and judge(s) in Maine. It includes the year in which the men were admitted to practice law (in parentheses). Also included are men who achieved other distinctions, such as becoming the first in their state to graduate from law school or become a political figure.

Firsts in Maine's history

Lawyers 

 First African American male: Macon Bolling Allen (1844): 
 First African American male (actively practice): Milton Roscoe Geary in 1913

State judges 

 First Jewish American male (Maine Supreme Court): Abraham M. Rudman in 1965 
 First African American male (Maine Supreme Court): Rick E. Lawrence in 2000 
 First African American male (Chief Justice; Maine Supreme Court): Rick E. Lawrence in 2022

Firsts in local history 

 Milton Roscoe Geary: First African American male to graduate from the University of Maine School of Law (1913) [Cumberland County, Maine]. He was the first African American male lawyer admitted to the Penobscot County Bar Association, Maine.
 John H. Hill (1879): First African American male lawyer admitted to the bar of the Supreme Judicial Court of Sagadahoc County, Maine

See also 
 List of first minority male lawyers and judges in the United States

Other topics of interest 

 List of first women lawyers and judges in the United States
 List of first women lawyers and judge in Maine

References 

 
Minority, Maine, first
Minority, Maine, first
Lists of people from Maine
Legal history of Maine
Maine lawyers